These are the Canadian number-one albums of 1978 as compiled  by RPM.

References

See also
List of Canadian number-one singles of 1978

1978
1978 record charts
1978 in Canadian music